Tom Lotherington (born 15 June 1950) is a Norwegian poet, novelist, biographer and translator. He made his literary debut in 1972 with the poetry collection Hverdagsfantasier. He has written the novels Den tredje tjeneren (1985) and Kjødets gjerninger (1989), and biographies on the poets Herman Wildenvey and Harald Sverdrup. He was head of The Norwegian Writers' Center from 2001 to 2005.

Lotherington received the Mads Wiel Nygaards Endowment in 1995 and the Herman Wildenvey Poetry Award in 2010.

References

1950 births
Living people
20th-century Norwegian novelists
21st-century Norwegian novelists
20th-century Norwegian poets
Norwegian male poets
Norwegian biographers
Male biographers
Norwegian translators
Norwegian male novelists
20th-century Norwegian male writers
21st-century Norwegian male writers